Triton Systems LLC is a manufacturer of automated teller machines (ATMs). Triton ATMs are built in Long Beach, Mississippi. Triton has been in business since 1979, and has nearly 200,000 installations in over 24 countries.

History
Founded in 1979 by Ernest L. Burdette, Frank J. Wilem, Jr., and Robert E. Sandoz, Triton Systems developed ATMjr, the world's first battery-powered and completely portable device for training bank customers to use what was, at the time, a fairly new banking service, the ATM. Triton followed this product with the development of a Card Activation System that allowed financial institutions to instantly issue ATM cards with customized (often customer chosen) personal identification numbers (PINs).

In the early 1990s, Triton pioneered in-store cash withdrawals with the introduction of the Scrip terminal, a machine that allows a store's customers to use an ATM card to generate a voucher, redeemable for cash at the register.

In 2000 Triton was acquired by Dover Corporation (NYSE-traded DOV), a diversified manufacturer of a wide range of proprietary products and components for industrial and commercial use. In 2004, Fujitsu and Triton entered into a strategic licensing agreement to provide a broader range of solutions for financial institutions and retailers though the deployment of Fujitsu's Windows-based Prism software on Triton ATMs. Later that same year Triton launched the RT2000, a smaller low-cost through-the-wall ATM, that was easy to install and easy to maintain. 120,000 ATMs were shipped to 17 countries around the world.

In 2005 Hurricane Katrina provided a major challenge for Triton. Its headquarters and manufacturing plant on the Mississippi Gulf coast was shut down, and the entire coastal area evacuated. Triton's Long Beach, Mississippi administrative, manufacturing and production facilities were back on-line within two weeks.

Triton opened a Memphis manufacturing and service facility in July 2006. In 2008 Triton launched the RL2000, a stand-alone ATM. Also that year Triton subsidiary, Calypso, began operations in Australia. On April 14, 2008, Calypso successfully conducted the largest migration of ATMs to be completed in a single day — 2,808 ATMs.

In March 2009, Triton introduced the RL1600, a new off-premises ATM. The RL1600 was named the Convenience Store and Petroleum (CSP) magazine Product of the Year for 2009. Also in March 2009, Triton made the decision to sell its Calypso processing operation in order to focus on ATM manufacturing, software development and support.

In September 2009, the company launched ATMGurus. ATMGurus provides customers with multi-brand parts, repair and training support for their ATM estates.

In July 2008, Nautilus Hyosung offered to acquire Triton from its parent company Dover Corporation for $63 million U.S. Dollars. However, in May 2009, citing anti-trust scrutiny from regulators, the acquisition was cancelled. Subsequently, in March 2010, Dover completed the sale of Triton to a group of private investors. The company is currently privately held.

ATMGurus
ATMGurus is a division of Triton Systems of Delaware Inc. and provides parts, repair, and training for a variety of retail ATM brands.

Partners/Industry Memberships and Associations
Triton has active membership in the following industry associations: 

 ATM Industry Association (ATMIA) 
 NAAIO (National Association of ATM ISOs and Operators) 
 FSPA (Financial and Security Products Association) 
 ICBA (Independent Community Banking Association)

References

Triton RL1600, Convenience Store and Petroleum product of year for 2009

External links
 Triton Systems home page
 Financial and Security Products Association
 National Association of ATM ISOs and Operators
 Independent Community Banking Association
 Installation of Crypto ATM In a US Airport
 GRG Int'l to acquire Triton for $25.6M
 ATM Industry Association

Automated teller machines
Companies based in Mississippi